San Marino participated in the Eurovision Song Contest 2021 in Rotterdam, the Netherlands. The Sammarinese broadcaster San Marino RTV (SMRTV) internally selected Senhit as their representative with the song "" featuring Flo Rida. Senhit was due to compete in the 2020 contest with "Freaky!" before the event's eventual cancellation and had also served as the nation's  entrant. "" was written and composed by Thomas Stengaard, Joy Deb, Linnea Deb, Jimmy Thörnfeldt, Kenny Silverdique, Suzi Pancenkov, Malou Linn Eloise Ruotsalainen and Chanel Tukia, along with Senhit and Flo Rida themselves. While Flo Rida had provided vocals for the track, his participation in the performance of the song on the Eurovision stage was only confirmed on the day of the second semi-final due to COVID-19-related travel restrictions.

To promote the entry, a music video for the song was released and Senhit made appearances on Polish and Albanian television as well as at a Eurovision Party in Spain in the lead up to the contest. San Marino performed first in the second semi-final of the Eurovision Song Contest 2021, held on 20 May 2021, and placed 9th, receiving 118 points. The entry qualified for the final held two days later, where the nation placed 22nd with 50 points. This marked their second-best placing to this point and their third qualification for the final.

Background 

Prior to the 2021 contest, San Marino had participated in the Eurovision Song Contest 10 times since their first entry in 2008. The nation's debut entry in the 2008 contest, "" performed by Miodio, failed to qualify for the final and placed last in the semi-final it competed in. From 2012 to 2014, San Marino sent Valentina Monetta to the contest on three consecutive occasions, which made her the first singer to participate in three consecutive contests since Udo Jürgens, who competed in 1964, 1965 and 1966 for Austria. San Marino's best placing up to 2021 was in the Eurovision Song Contest 2019 where Serhat appeared for his second participation and finished in 19th place in the final, singing "Say Na Na Na". Senhit later revealed that she would return to represent San Marino in the next contest in 2021.

Before Eurovision

Internal selection 
On 16 May 2020, during the Eurovision Song Contest 2020 replacement event Eurovision: Europe Shine a Light, which showcased the entries that were set to take part in the canceled contest, Senhit announced that she would return to represent San Marino in the Eurovision Song Contest 2021. Joining her would be artistic and creative director Luca Tommassini, who also served in that role for the canceled 2020 participation. Senhit's song was originally scheduled to be revealed on 23 February 2021, however, the date was later changed to 8 March. Following a leak of the song on 7 March, "" was officially presented as San Marino's entry a day early. The song features vocals from American rapper Flo Rida and was written and composed by Thomas Stengaard, Joy Deb, Linnea Deb, Jimmy Thörnfeldt, Kenny Silverdique, Suzi Pancenkov, Malou Linn Eloise Ruotsalainen and Chanel Tukia, along with Senhit and Flo Rida themselves. Both Joy and Linnea Deb had previously composed Sweden's 2015 winning Eurovision entry "Heroes", while Stengaard had previously composed the winning Eurovision entry for Denmark in 2013, titled "Only Teardrops". In writing about the song's selection, San Marino's team noted that the song is of an international style featuring electropop, Latin sounds and two instruments from Eritrea: the krar and the kebero. While the song and music video both included Flo Rida, it was not decided upon the song's reveal if he would also perform on the Eurovision stage. The delegation noted that either way, Flo Rida's vocals would remain. By 11 March, a new version of the song was released, which included changes to its composition and a new bridge before the last chorus. These changes also moved Flo Rida's vocals earlier in the song and added him to the credits.

Promotion

From summer 2020, Senhit and Tommassini ran a promotional campaign entitled #FreakyTripToRotterdam where Senhit covered past Eurovision songs and documented her journey to the 2021 contest. To promote "" specifically, a music video directed by Tomassini was released on 7 March 2021, coinciding with the song's presentation. Senhit's promotional activities for the entry saw her stopping in several countries in the lead up to the contest. In mid-April, she appeared alongside Polish Eurovision entrant Rafal on the show , recording performances that would later air in mid-May. Later that month on 24 April, she performed "" at the annual PrePartyES21 event in Spain. This was followed by an appearance the next day on the Albanian show  where she performed the song live.

At Eurovision 
The Eurovision Song Contest 2021 took place at Rotterdam Ahoy in Rotterdam, the Netherlands, and consisted of two semi-finals held on the respective dates of 18 and 20 May and the final on 22 May 2021. According to Eurovision rules, all nations with the exceptions of the host country and the "Big Five" (France, Germany, Italy, Spain and the United Kingdom) are required to qualify from one of two semi-finals to compete in the final; the top ten countries from each semi-final progress to the final. For the 2021 contest, the semi-final allocation draw held on 28 January 2020 for the previous year's canceled contest was used. The European Broadcasting Union (EBU) split up the competing countries into six different pots based on voting patterns from previous contests as determined by the contest's televoting partner Digame. San Marino was placed into the second semi-final, to be held on 20 May 2021, and was scheduled to perform in the first half of the show. Once all the competing songs for the 2021 contest had been released, the running order for the semi-finals was decided by the shows' producers rather than through another draw, so that similar songs were not placed next to each other. San Marino was set to perform in position one, preceding the entry from Estonia.

Senhit was scheduled for technical rehearsals on 10 and 13 May. Following the first technical rehearsal where a stand-in singer performed in place of Flo Rida, Senhit stated that she would not confirm nor deny Flo Rida's inclusion in the final performance. Until 18 May, the day of the first semi-final, it had still been unknown whether Flo Rida would accompany Senhit on stage for the performance. The eventual announcement of his inclusion was made upon his arrival in Rotterdam, with Senhit noting that it was difficult to predict what travel restrictions would be in place at the time of the contest.

Performances
On 20 May, Senhit and Flo Rida performed the song in position one of the second semi-final. The performance featured Senhit wearing a baroque style crown, with her and her choreographers wearing outfits designed by stylist Simone Guidarelli. At the end of the night, San Marino was announced as one of the ten countries to have qualified for the final. The qualification marked the third time the nation would make it to the final in its contest history. It was later revealed that the entry placed ninth in the semi-final, receiving a total of 118 points. Soon after, the EBU posted the running order for the final, placing San Marino in position 26th (last), following . At the close of voting for the final, held on 22 May, "" placed 22nd in the field of 26.

Prior to its finals performance, the jury final took place on 21 May, where the professional juries of each country watched and voted on the competing entries, an event that determines half of the vote for the final. During the performance, the platform on which the artists were positioned started rotating too late and kept moving past its scheduled stop time. This caused camera angles for viewers to be misaligned while also requiring the performers to jump to the stage from the moving platform. In a joint press release by Senhit's staff and SMRTV regarding the incident, officials stated that this technical issue posed serious safety concerns to the performers and the nation's vote was potentially compromised as juries were not necessarily informed of the incident prior to voting. In response, EBU Executive Supervisor Martin Österdahl deemed the jury vote valid for the performance and that the issue had been addressed with the highest priority.

Voting 

Below is a breakdown of points awarded to San Marino in the second semi-final, as well as by the country in the final. Voting during the three shows involved each country awarding two sets of points from 1-8, 10 and 12: one from their professional jury and the other from televoting. The exact composition of the professional jury, and the results of each country's jury and televoting were released after the final; the individual results from each jury member were also released in an anonymised form. San Marino's jury consisted of Antonio Cecchetti, Elisa Manzaroli, Fabrizio Raggi, Jimmy JDKA, and Marilia Reffi. In the second semi-final, San Marino placed 9th with a total of 118 points, thus qualifying for the final. The performance received 42 televoting points, which included the maximum 12 awarded by Georgia. The jury points added to 76, including 10 from Greece, Malta and Poland. In the final, San Marino placed 22nd with 50 points, with Poland awarding San Marino its first ever 12-points from a jury. Over the course of the contest, San Marino awarded its 12 points to Poland (jury) and Moldova (televote) in the second semi-final, and to France (jury) and Italy (televote) in the final.

Points awarded to San Marino

Points awarded by San Marino

Detailed voting results

References 

2021
Countries in the Eurovision Song Contest 2021
Eurovision